Steven Andrew Selwood (24 November 1979) is a former English cricketer who played for Derbyshire between 2001 and 2004.

Selwood was born at Barnet, Hertfordshire, the son of Tim Selwood who played for Middlesex  between 1966 and 1973. Selwood played initially for Middlesex and joined Derbyshire in the 2001 season. He was a left-handed batsman and a left-arm slow bowler.
His highest score at County level was 99.

References

1979 births
English cricketers
Living people
Derbyshire cricketers
Middlesex cricketers
Dorset cricketers